Amorpha-4,11-diene is a precursor to artemisinin.

See also
 Amorpha-4,11-diene synthase

References

Sesquiterpenes